Alice Ludwig (or Alice Ludwig-Rasch) (15 January 1910 – 2 November 1973) was a German film editor who worked on many films and television series between 1932 and 1973. After first entering the film industry during the Weimar Republic, she worked continuously during the Nazi era. Following the Second World War she edited Marriage in the Shadows (1947), an anti-Nazi work of the rubble film period. Much of her later film work was in popular melodramas such as Gabriela (1950). From the 1960s onwards she switched to working in television, her final employment being the editing over fifty episodes of the crime series Hamburg Transit.

Selected filmography
 Ship Without a Harbour (1932)
 Spell of the Looking Glass (1932)
 Hans Westmar (1933)
 Anna and Elizabeth (1933)
 Last Stop (1935)
 The Valley of Love (1935)
 The Muzzle (1938)
 Midsummer Night's Fire (1939)
 Opera Ball (1939)
 Central Rio (1939)
 Vienna Tales (1940)
 Roses in Tyrol (1940)
 The Swedish Nightingale (1941)
 Rembrandt (1942)
 A Man With Principles? (1943)
 The Eternal Tone (1943)
 Die Fledermaus (1946)
 Marriage in the Shadows (1947)
 Chemistry and Love (1948)
 The Last Night (1949)
 Second Hand Destiny (1949)
 Gabriela (1950)
 Third from the Right (1950)
 Unknown Sender (1950)
 The Man in Search of Himself (1950)
 The Allure of Danger (1950)
 Harbour Melody (1950)
 Maya of the Seven Veils (1951)
 The Dubarry (1951)
 Toxi (1952)
 Dreaming Lips (1953)
 Money from the Air (1954)
 The False Adam (1955)
 Father's Day (1955)
 Bandits of the Autobahn (1955)
 The Heart of St. Pauli (1957)
 Thirteen Old Donkeys (1958)
 Doctor Crippen Lives (1958)
 The Girl from the Marsh Croft (1958)
 Heart Without Mercy (1958)
 The Night Before the Premiere (1959)
 Mrs. Warren's Profession (1960)
 Pension Schöller (1960)
 The Happy Years of the Thorwalds (1962)

References

Bibliography
 Shandley, Robert. Rubble Films: German Cinema in the Shadow of the Third Reich. Temple University Press, 2010

External links

1910 births
1973 deaths
German film editors
Mass media people from Berlin
German women film editors